UiTM Faculty of Law is one of the professional graduate faculties of UiTM and is located in Shah Alam, Malaysia. It is among the notable public premier law school in Malaysia.

The current Dean of the faculty is Dr. Hartini Saripan, who assumed the role in 2018.

The faculty currently consists of some 100 academic staff. It has about 1,144 students studying pre-law, BLS (Hons) and LL.B (Hons).

History
The Faculty of Law was founded in 1968. It was formerly known as the Faculty of Administration and Law and before as the School of Administration and Law. It began as a centre offering British external programmes, namely the LL.B(Hons) University of London and the Chartered Institute of Secretaries (now Institute of Chartered Secretaries and Administrators). The only internal programme offered then was the Diploma in Public Administration and Local Government.

On 14 January 2004, the Faculty of Administration and Law have been separated to two faculties namely the Faculty of Law and the Faculty of Administrative Science and Policy Studies.

Programmes

Undergraduate

In 1978, the LL.B (Hons) University of London programme was discontinued and replaced by the Diploma in Law (DIL) programme. The DIL programme is equivalent to the LL.B programme offered in British Universities. It is a three-year academic programme based on the structure of British Universities undergraduate law programmes. Unlike most of the British programmes however, the DIL programme at the faculty is conducted on a semester system.

Soon after, the faculty had renamed its programmes and DIL was renamed as the LL.B (general law degree). The LL.B programme, however, was postgraduate programmes (PhD and LL.M. programmes).
replaced with the Bachelor of Legal Studies (Hons) or BLS (Hons), which was introduced in 2002.

In 1982, the Faculty introduced a one-year Advanced Diploma in Law (ADIL) programme for graduates of the DIL programme. The ADIL programme is equivalent to a LL.B (Hons) degree and recognised for legal practice. It is a simulatory programme designed to provide professional training for students in preparation for their career in the legal practice as Advocates and Solicitors. ADIL then became the LL.B (Hons). This LL.B (Hons) programme is unique in which it was designed after the Inns of Court in England. The students are put in a simulated legal office environment in which they are designated in firms and given case studies.

The BLS (Hons) programme was discontinued by the Faculty in the recent years. Currently, the Faculty is only offering the four-years LL.B (Hons) programme for undergraduate while still maintaining the Final-year as the professional training-course. Graduates of this programme are eligible to practice as Deputy Public Prosecutors, Federal Counsels, Parliamentary Draftsmen in the Attorney General's Chambers (AGC), or Judicial Legal Services (JLS) as Magistrates, Arbitrators and also be admitted as Advocates and Solicitors.

Postgraduates

For postgraduates, the faculty offered three (3) programmes which are master in laws (LL.M), PhD in law and diploma in Syariah law and practice (DLSA).

DLSA is a professional programme designed to train those who are interested in practising in the Syariah Courts and those who want to be Syarie lawyers. Apart from providing hands-on training to students, this programme intends to expose students to several aspects of Syariah Law. It also aims to enhance their knowledge in the different procedures (mal) practiced in the Syariah Courts as opposed to the civil courts. Furthermore, students will be trained in matters pertaining to Syariah trial and advocacy. The graduate of DLSA is eligible to undertake examination in order to be admitted as a Shariah practitioner according to the state in Malaysia.

For LL.M programme, the Faculty offered both coursework and research-based Masters programme. Among the area of law offered such as Intellectual Property (IP) law, Corporate Law, Legal Aspect of Marine Affairs, Public & Public Interest Law, Commercial Law. The Faculty are also offering the Master programme for non-law graduate such as Master in Legal Studies and Master of Laws (Enforcement Law). The student of a Master programme will be supervised by senior lecturers and professors of the Faculty.

The PhD programme intends to train candidates to develop some conceptual and analytical capabilities in the field of law through a rigorous examination of an original study to be conducted under the supervision of a supervisor from the faculty. The areas of research among others, such as Constitutional Law, Public International Law, Intellectual Property law, Maritime and Shipping law, Criminology and Criminal Justice, Islamic Criminal Law, Comparative Corporate Law, Environmental Law. The Faculty allowed the admission for international applicant.

Reference to the Common Bar Course (CBC)

Early in March 2011, the Attorney-General announced that the Legal Qualifying Board was considering implementing the Common Bar Course (CBC). Court of Appeal judge Datuk Abdul Wahab Patail is chairing a working group to study its implementation. The CBC would be a 20-month course that would also focus on vocational skills. The CBC model combines the modern legal education approaches in other Commonwealth countries as well as local requirements. There will be modules not commonly seen in other courses to meet specific needs among local graduates, such as the Legal Language and Communication Skills to address the poor command of English and the Practice Management Skills to expose lawyers intending to start their own firm on risk management. Of the five semesters, the first three are full-time studies while the final two are part-time, where students will be pupils at law firms concurrently. It will also feature a Student Law Office programme where the "students-at-law" will get to practice what they have learned in a simulated legal environment, which has been successfully carried out in UiTM Faculty of Law.

Research and Publication

UiTM Law Review

As a reputable public law school in Malaysia, the Faculty has also published a law journal known as UiTM Law Review. UiTM Law Review is a learned journal of the Faculty of Law, UiTM with its inaugural issue in 2001. It reflects the institution's maturity and ability to manage and conduct its specialist discipline. The journal functions also as a meeting point for law teachers and practitioners who share a common interest in various areas of law. It provides them a source of information on the current and topical issues in their specialised areas. It creates a forum for the exchange of ideas and for engaging in discourse over sometimes intricate and often vexed legal issues.

The journal is widely recognised in legal fraternity in Malaysia, with various private practitioner, law teachers, former judges and senior Member of the Bar are also participate in contributing to the law journal. As such, the recognition that was gained from peers, both within and without the discipline, will speak for their standing and credibility in the community, both scholarly and otherwise. Thus, this journal has served as one channel for the faculty members and other contributors to reach that wider audience.

The Editors of the law journal are consists of a notable person in the legal fraternity, locally and internationally in which among others are Prof Dato' Dr Rahmat Mohamad, Prof Dr Gonzalo Villalta Puig (The Chinese University of Hong Kong), Assoc Prof Dr Karen Bubna-Litic (University of South Australia).

Controversy

In 2007, former Dean, Khalid Yusoff, was jailed three months for forgery and cheating in the July 2001 Certificate in Legal Practice examination "master list". In May 2010, he was freed by the Court of Appeal.

Notable staff
Emeritus Professor. Datuk Dr. Shad Saleem Faruqi
 Adjunct Professor The Right Honourable Chief Justice of Malaysia, Tun Datuk Seri Zaki Tun Azmi

Alumni

 The Right Honourable Tan Sri Datuk Seri Panglima Richard Malanjum, the former Chief Justice of Malaysia.
 His Excellency, Professor Dr Rahmat Mohamad, Secretary General, Asian African Legal Consultative Organization (AALCO), New Delhi, India.
 Puan Hasbi Hassan, Judge of the Kuala Lumpur Criminal Sessions Court 
 Datuk Zaid Ibrahim, founder of the largest law firm in Malaysia, President of Parti Kesejahteraan Insan Tanah Air, former Senator, former Minister in the Prime Minister's Department and former member of the Central Leadership Council (Majlis Pimpinan Pusat), Parti Keadilan Rakyat.
 Yunalis Zarai, Malaysian award-winning artist
 Professor Madya Datin Paduka Saudah Sulaiman, Former Member of Legal Profession Qualifying Board (LPQB) from 2010–2017.
 Mr Ahmad Janatul Firdaus bin Datuk Dr Haji Dzulkarnain', Tokoh Pekerja Negara (Eksekutif) 2019 recipient.

References

External links
Official Faculty of Law Website 

Universiti Teknologi MARA
Law schools in Malaysia
Universities and colleges in Selangor
Educational institutions established in 1968
1968 establishments in Malaysia